Crambus dimidiatellus is a moth in the family Crambidae. It was described by Augustus Radcliffe Grote in 1883. It is found in North America, where it has been recorded from New Mexico, Arizona and Colorado.

References

Crambini
Moths described in 1883
Moths of North America